Marc Sangnier (3 April 1873, Paris – 28 May 1950, Paris) was a French Roman Catholic thinker and politician, who in 1894 founded Le Sillon ("The Furrow"), a social Catholic movement.

Work
Sangnier aimed to bring the Catholic Church into a greater conformity with French Republican ideals and to provide an alternative to anticlerical labour movements. The movement was initially successful, but was eventually condemned by Pope Pius X in the letter Notre charge apostolique in 1910. A plaque however in the garden of the Marc Sangnier Institute in Boulevard Raspail recalls the visit some years later of Cardinal Cerretti, the emissary of Pope Benedict XV. In 1912 Sangnier founded a replacement group, the Young Republic League to promote his vision of social Catholicism.

Sangnier founded a newspaper, La Démocratie, which campaigned for equality for women, proportional representation at elections, and for pacifism. He was also one of the pioneers of the French youth-hostelling movement. In 1928 he employed the 19-year-old Émilien Amaury in his first job, from which he went on to found the Amaury publishing empire.

References

External links
 Biography (in French)

1873 births
1950 deaths
Politicians from Paris
French Roman Catholics
Young Republic League politicians
Popular Republican Movement politicians
Members of the 12th Chamber of Deputies of the French Third Republic
Members of the Constituent Assembly of France (1945)
Members of the Constituent Assembly of France (1946)
Deputies of the 1st National Assembly of the French Fourth Republic
Collège Stanislas de Paris alumni